Duke , son of Hiromichi, was a Japanese nobleman and politician of the Meiji period (1868–1912) who served as a member of House of Peers in the Diet of Japan. Takatsukasa Nobuhiro was his brother, and Toshimichi was his son. A keen ornithologist he went by the nickname of “Bird Prince” (Kotori no koshaku).

Takatsukasa graduated in zoology from the Imperial University of Tokyo (1914) where he studied under Isao Ijima and received a doctorate in 1943. He was a specialist on birds and published several papers and books on the birds of Japan, collaborating with other Japanese ornithologists including Y. Yamashina and M. U. Hachisuka. He also worked with Oliver L. Austin Jr. (1903-1988). He was also a keen aviculturist. He presided over the Ornithological Society of Japan from 1922 to 1946. His books included Kaidori (1917), Kaidori Shusei (1930) and Japanese Birds (1941). In 1944 he became high priest for the Meiji Shrine and was involved in the "Great Zoo Massacre" of 1943 at the Ueno zoological gardens. He presided over the "Memorial Service for Martyred Animals" following the killing of the animals.

His son Toshimichi married Kazuko Takatsukasa, daughter of Emperor Hirohito.

References

1889 births
1959 deaths
Fujiwara clan
Takatsukasa family
Japanese ornithologists